John Rasmussen may refer to: 
John Rasmussen (painter), one of the Pennsylvania Almshouse Painters
John Rasmussen (professor) (born 1963), Danish professor
John Boye Rasmussen (born 1982), Danish handball player